Francis Benjamin Johnson Jr. (June 13, 1918 – April 8, 1996) was an American film and television actor, stuntman, and world-champion rodeo cowboy. Tall and laconic, Johnson brought authenticity to many roles in Westerns with his droll manner and expert horsemanship.

The son of a rancher, Johnson arrived in Hollywood to deliver a consignment of horses for a film. He did stunt-double work for several years before breaking into acting with the help of John Ford.  An elegiac portrayal of a former cowboy theater owner in the 1950s coming-of-age drama The Last Picture Show won Johnson the 1971 Academy Award, BAFTA Award, and Golden Globe Award for Best Supporting Actor.

Johnson also operated a horse-breeding ranch throughout his career. Although he said he had succeeded by sticking to what he knew, shrewd real estate investments made Johnson worth an estimated $100 million by his later years.

Early life
Johnson was born in Foraker, Oklahoma, on the Osage Indian Reservation, of Irish and Cherokee ancestry, the son of Ollie Susan Johnson (née Workmon) and Ben Johnson Sr. His father was a rancher and rodeo champion in Osage County.

Film career
Johnson's film career began with the Howard Hughes film The Outlaw.

Johnson liked to say later that he got to Hollywood in a carload of horses.

His work as a stuntman caught the eye of director John Ford, who hired Johnson for stunt work in the 1948 film Fort Apache, and as the riding double for Henry Fonda. During shooting, the horses pulling a wagon with three men in it stampeded. Johnson, who "happened to be settin' on a horse", stopped the runaway wagon and saved the men. When Ford promised that he would be rewarded, Johnson hoped it would be with another doubling job, or maybe a small speaking role. Instead, he received a seven-year acting contract from Ford. Ford called Johnson into his office, and handed him an envelope with a contract in it. Johnson started reading it, and when he got to the fifth line and it said "$5,000 a week," he stopped reading, grabbed a pen, signed it, and gave it back to Ford.

His first credited role was in Ford's 3 Godfathers; the film is notable for the riding skills demonstrated by both Johnson and star Pedro Armendáriz. He later said the film was the most physically challenging of his career. Ford then suggested a starring role  for him in the 1949 film Mighty Joe Young; he played Gregg opposite Terry Moore. Ford cast him in the remaining two of the three films that have come to be known as Ford's cavalry trilogy, all starring John Wayne: She Wore a Yellow Ribbon (1949), and Rio Grande (1950) joining Fort Apache.  Both roles showcased Johnson's riding ability. Ford also cast Johnson as the lead in Wagon Master (1950), one of Ford's favorites.

In real life, Johnson did not show any bad temper; his demeanor in tense situations was calm but firm. Although known for avoiding drama, he had definite boundaries; during the making of Rio Grande he defied Ford, who was notorious for browbeating his actors, and reportedly told him to go to hell. Johnson thought the incident had been forgotten, but Ford did not use him in a film for over a decade. Johnson also appeared in four films of Sam Peckinpah and had a good relationship with the tempestuous director. Peckinpah appreciated Johnson's authenticity and lack of acting airs.

Johnson played in supporting roles in Shane (1953), where he appeared as Chris Calloway, a "bad guy who makes good" after being beaten senseless by Alan Ladd, and One-Eyed Jacks (1961) starring Marlon Brando. In 1964, he worked with Ford again in Cheyenne Autumn. He also appeared in four Peckinpah-directed films: Major Dundee (1965, with Charlton Heston), The Wild Bunch (1969, with William Holden and Robert Ryan), and  back-to-back Steve McQueen films, The Getaway and the rodeo film Junior Bonner (both 1972). In 1973, he co-starred as Melvin Purvis in John Milius' Dillinger with Warren Oates; he also appeared in Milius' 1984 film Red Dawn. In 1975, he played the character Mister in Bite the Bullet, starring Gene Hackman and James Coburn. He also appeared with Charles Bronson in 1975's Breakheart Pass. In 1980, he was cast as Sheriff Isum Gorch in Soggy Bottom U.S.A.

Johnson played Bartlett in the 1962–63 season of Have Gun Will Travel, which featured a short scene of his riding skills. In 1963, Johnson appeared as Spinner on the TV Western The Virginian in the episode titled "Duel at Shiloh".  In the 1966–67 television season, Johnson appeared as the character Sleeve in all 26 episodes of the ABC family Western The Monroes with co-stars Michael Anderson Jr. and Barbara Hershey.

He teamed up with John Wayne again, and director Andrew V. McLaglen, in two films, appearing with Rock Hudson in The Undefeated (1969) and in a fairly prominent role in Chisum (1970). The apex of Johnson's career was reached in 1971, with Johnson winning an Academy Award for his performance as Sam the Lion in The Last Picture Show, directed by Peter Bogdanovich.

On the set of The Train Robbers, in June 1972, he told Nancy Anderson of Copley News Service that winning the Oscar for The Last Picture Show was not going to change him and he would not raise his salary request to studios because of it. He continued, "I grew up on a ranch and I know livestock, so I like working in Westerns. All my life I've been afraid of failure. To avoid it, I've stuck with doing things I know how to do, and it's made me a good living".

He played Cap Roundtree in the 1979 miniseries The Sacketts. He played Sam Bellows in the 1980 film Ruckus and Jack Mason in the 1984 action adventure Red Dawn. He co-starred in the 1994 version of Angels in the Outfield.

He continued ranching during the entire time, operating a horse-breeding ranch in Sylmar, California. In addition, he sponsored the Ben Johnson Pro Celebrity Team Roping and Penning competition, held in Oklahoma City and in Katy, Texas, the proceeds of which are donated to both the Children's Medical Research Inc. and the Children's Hospital of Oklahoma.

Rodeo championship 
Johnson was drawn to the rodeos and horse breeding of his early years. In 1953, he took a break from well-paid film work to compete in the Rodeo Cowboys Association (RCA), becoming the Team Roping World Champion; although he only broke even financially that year. Johnson was inducted into the ProRodeo Hall of Fame in 1979. According to his ProRodeo Hall of Fame entry, he said, "I've won a rodeo world championship, and I'm prouder of that than anything else I've ever done."

Personal life 
Johnson's 1941 marriage to Carol Elaine Jones lasted until her death on March 27, 1994. They had no children. She was the daughter of noted Hollywood horse wrangler Clarence "Fat" Jones.

Johnson continued to work almost steadily until his death from a heart attack at the age of 77. On April 8, 1996, the veteran actor collapsed while visiting his then 96-year-old mother Ollie at Leisure World in Mesa, Arizona, the suburban Phoenix retirement community where they both lived.  Johnson's body was later transported from Arizona to Pawhuska, Oklahoma, for burial at the Pawhuska City Cemetery.

Ollie died on October 16, 2000, aged 101.

In 2003 Johnson was inducted into the Texas Trail of Fame.

Legacy
For his contribution to the motion picture industry, Johnson has a star on the Hollywood Walk of Fame at 7083 Hollywood Boulevard. In 1982, he was inducted into the Western Performers Hall of Fame at the National Cowboy & Western Heritage Museum in Oklahoma City. In 1996, Tom Thurman made a documentary film about Johnson's life, titled Ben Johnson: Third Cowboy on the Right, written by Thurman and Tom Marksbury.

The Ben Johnson Cowboy Museum was opened in honor of Ben Johnson in his hometown of Pawhuska in June 2019. The museum showcases the life and career of Ben Johnson, as well as his father, Ben Johnson Sr., who was also a world-champion cowboy. In addition to the Ben Johnsons, the museum also features other world-champion cowboys and cowgirls, famous ranches (like the one Ben grew up on), and cowboy artists and craftsmen, all from the area where Ben grew up.

The Ben Johnson Memorial Steer Roping and the International Roundup Cavalcade, the world's largest amateur rodeo, are held annually in Pawhuska, Oklahoma.

A one-and-a-quarter-sized bronze sculpture by John D. Free of Ben Johnson riding a horse and roping a steer was commissioned and produced in Pawhuska, Oklahoma.

Filmography

Film (actor and stuntman)

Television

References

Further reading
 
 http://files.usgwarchives.net/ok/osage/obits/lssnwrdr.txt (archive of Ollie Susan Johnson's obituary)
 Ancestry.com

External links

 
 
 

1918 births
1996 deaths
20th-century American male actors
American male film actors
American male television actors
American people of Cherokee descent
American people of Irish descent
Best Supporting Actor BAFTA Award winners
Best Supporting Actor Academy Award winners
Best Supporting Actor Golden Globe (film) winners
Male actors from Oklahoma
Male actors from Phoenix, Arizona
Male Western (genre) film actors
People from Mesa, Arizona
People from Osage County, Oklahoma
ProRodeo Hall of Fame inductees
Roping (rodeo)